Cheba Hut Toasted Subs (Stylized as "CHēBA HUT") is a cannabis-themed restaurant franchise-chain in the United States.

It was founded by Scott Jennings, established in 1998 in Tempe, Arizona. The first store was opened near the campus of Arizona State University where Jennings attended college.

External links

References

Restaurants established in 1998
Restaurant chains in the United States
Companies based in Fort Collins, Colorado
Cannabis culture
1998 establishments in Arizona